Bryant Kevin Dunston Jr. (born May 28, 1986) is an American-born naturalized Armenian professional basketball player who plays at the center position for Anadolu Efes of the Turkish Basketball Super League (BSL) and the EuroLeague. He also represents the senior Armenian national team internationally.

In 2011–12, he was the top rebounder in the Israel Basketball Premier League. Dunston earned an All-EuroLeague Second Team selection in 2017.

Early life
Dunston was born in southern Kentucky, and grew up in LeFrak City, Queens. He is a graduate of St. John's Preparatory High School. He is the nephew of former professional baseball player Shawon Dunston, a former No. 1 pick in the MLB.

College career
Dunston attended Fordham University, where he played college basketball with the Fordham Rams. He finished his collegiate career by being named to the First Team All-Metropolitan, Second Team All-Atlantic 10 Conference, and Atlantic 10 Conference All-Defensive Team.

In his college career, Dunston appeared in all 120 of Fordham's games, starting in 118 of them. He finished his college career in second place on Fordham's all-time scoring list, with 1,832 career points, in third place on Fordham's all-time rebounds list, with 993 career rebounds, and as Fordham's career blocked shots leader, graduating with 294 career rejections.

Professional career
Dunston played with Mobis Phoebus in the Korean Basketball League. In 2010, he signed with the Greek League club Aris, but left the team in February 2011.

After leaving Aris, he signed with the Israeli League club Bnei HaSharon. Following the 2010–11 season, Dunston joined the Israeli League club Hapoel Holon. In 2011–12, he was the top rebounder in the Israel Basketball Premier League.

Reports said that Dunston was on the verge of signing a guaranteed contract with the NBA's Brooklyn Nets in the summer 2012. However, he joined the Italian League club Pallacanestro Varese instead.

Olympiacos
On July 9, 2013, Dunston signed a two-year contract with Olympiacos. In his first EuroLeague season, he averaged 10.3 points, 5.3 rebounds, 1.1 steals and league-leading 1.3 blocks over 29 games played. Olympiacos however finished the participation in the EuroLeague by losing 2–3 to Real Madrid in the quarter-final series. On May 6, he was voted the EuroLeague Best Defender of the season.

On May 6, 2015, he was named the EuroLeague season's Best Defender for the second season in a row.

Anadolu Efes
On June 23, 2015, Dunston signed a two-year contract with the Turkish club Anadolu Efes. On May 18, 2017, he signed a two-year contract extension with Anadolu Efes.

On May 23, 2019, Dunston signed another two-year contract extension with the club. He signed a two-year extension on July 26, 2020, with an option for another year. On November 6, Dunston was ruled out for a month following an eye injury.

National team career
On June 16, 2015, he was included on the list of candidates of the senior Slovenian national basketball team for the EuroBasket 2015, by team selector Jure Zdovc. However, he didn't get a Slovenian passport in time, so he wouldn't represent Slovenia at the EuroBasket.

In June 2016, Dunston arrived in Yerevan, to represent the senior Armenian national basketball team in the 2016 FIBA European Championship for Small Countries.

Career statistics

EuroLeague

|-
| style="text-align:left;"| 2013–14
| style="text-align:left;" rowspan=2| Olympiacos
| 29 || 21 || 24.7 || .670 || .000 || .566 || 5.3 || 1.0 || 1.1 || style="background:#CFECEC;"|1.3 || 10.3 || 15.0
|-
| style="text-align:left;"| 2014–15
| 29 || 25 || 19.4 || .543 || .000 || .618 || 4.4 || .6 || .8 || 1.1 || 7.1 || 9.0
|-
| style="text-align:left;"| 2015–16
| style="text-align:left;" rowspan=4| Anadolu Efes
| 24 || 15 || 21.0 || .604 || .000 || .655 || 5.0 || .8 || .5 || 1.1 || 7.9 || 11.5
|-
| style="text-align:left;"| 2016–17
| 35 || 34 || 28.9 || .551 || .000 || .679 || 6.2 || 1.1 || .6 || 1.1 || 10.7 || 14.6
|-
| style="text-align:left;"| 2017–18
| 30 || 28 || 28.0 || .645 || .333 || .697 || 5.4 || 1.3 || .7 || style="background:#cfecec;"|1.7 || 10.2 || 15.5
|-
| style="text-align:left;"| 2018–19
| 36 || 32 || 26.1 || .640 || .333 || .701 || 4.9 || 1.3 || .8 || 1.2 || 8.9 || 13.5
|- class="sortbottom"
| style="text-align:left;"| Career
| style="text-align:left;"|
| 183 || 155 || 25.0 || .608 || .250 || .665 || 5.2 || 1.1 || .8 || 1.3 || 9.3 || 13.3

Awards and accomplishments

College
 Atlantic 10 Conference Rookie of the Year: (2005)
 Second Team All-Atlantic 10 Conference: (2005)
 First Team All-Atlantic 10 Conference: (2006)
 Second Team All-Atlantic 10 Conference: (2007)
 First Team All-Metropolitan: (2008) 
 Second Team All-Atlantic 10 Conference: (2008)
 Atlantic 10 Conference All Defensive Team: (2008)

Professional
 Israeli Super League Quintet: (2012)
 FIBA Intercontinental Cup Champion: (2013)
 2× EuroLeague Best Defender: (2014, 2015)
 Greek League Champion: (2015)
 Greek League Best Defender: (2015)
 Turkish President's Cup: Winner (2015)
 Turkish BSL All-Star: (2017)
 All-EuroLeague Second Team: (2017)
 Turkish Cup Winner: (2018)

References

External links

 Bryant Dunston at draftexpress.com
 Bryant Dunston at esake.gr
 Bryant Dunston at eurobasket.com
 Bryant Dunston at euroleague.net
 Bryant Dunston at fibaeurope.com
 Bryant Dunston at legabasket.it
 Bryant Dunston at sports-reference.com
 Bryant Dunston at tblstat.net

1986 births
Living people
African-American basketball players
American expatriate basketball people in Greece
American expatriate basketball people in Israel
American expatriate basketball people in Italy
American expatriate basketball people in South Korea
American expatriate basketball people in Turkey
American men's basketball players
Anadolu Efes S.K. players
Aris B.C. players
Armenian men's basketball players
Armenian people of African-American descent
Bnei HaSharon players
Centers (basketball)
Fordham Rams men's basketball players
Greek Basket League players
Hapoel Holon players
Lega Basket Serie A players
Naturalized citizens of Armenia
Olympiacos B.C. players
Pallacanestro Varese players
Power forwards (basketball)
Sportspeople from Queens, New York
Basketball players from New York City
Ulsan Hyundai Mobis Phoebus players
21st-century African-American sportspeople
20th-century African-American people
Armenian expatriate sportspeople in Turkey